Orasema occidentalis is a species of chalcid wasp in the family Eucharitidae.

References

Further reading

External links

 

Parasitic wasps
Insects described in 1892
Chalcidoidea